Spring Weekend is a student-organized music festival hosted annually in April at Brown University in Providence, Rhode Island. Spring Weekend was officially founded in 1950, though is rooted in a late 19th century spring festival tradition known as Junior Promenade. Celebrity artists were first brought to campus starting in the 1960s. 

The festival is organized by the Brown Concert Agency, a student group overseen by Brown's Student Activities Office and funded by the university's Undergraduate Finance Board. Historical Spring Weekend acts include Bob Dylan (1964 and 1997), Ella Fitzgerald (1965), Ray Charles (1967), James Brown (1968), Bruce Springsteen (1974), U2 (1983), R.E.M. (1985), and Sonic Youth (1998). More recent headliners include Snoop Dogg (2010), Childish Gambino (2012), Kendrick Lamar (2013), Young Thug (2017), Daniel Caesar (2019), and Mitski (2019). Noted non-musical Spring Weekend guests include Martin Luther King Jr. (1967) and Allen Ginsberg (1968).

In 2020, the festival was cancelled for the first time since 1950 in response to the COVID-19 pandemic.

History

Junior Promenade 
Spring Weekend is rooted in a late 19th century spring tradition at Brown known as Junior Promenade. In 1897, the university's Junior Class Committee met to discuss the possibility of a spring celebration; while originally dismissed, the idea resurfaced the following year and gained approval; the inaugural Junior Promenade was held in 1898. In 1901, the tradition was restructured as Junior Week, adopting a longer and more diverse program of events and student performances.

Early iterations 
Junior Week and Promenade lapsed during World War II and in 1948 were replaced with All-Campus Weekend. Spring Weekend, in turn, succeeded All-Campus Weekend in 1950. The inaugural Spring Weekend featured club events, student performances, athletic contests, a buffet, and dances held in Faunce House and fraternity houses. In the 1960s, concerts and shows featuring celebrity artists replaced student performances and dances. In 1960, students formed the Brown Concert Agency to plan and organize the event. Headliners of the festival in its early years included Bob Dylan (1964) and Ella Fitzgerald (1965). In 1967, the festival featured Peter, Paul and Mary, Ray Charles, and Jefferson Airplane; Martin Luther King Jr., in Providence on other business, preached at the Sunday morning Protestant service held in Sayles Hall.

The 1968 festival was larger than its predecessors and marked Spring Weekend's transition from a "drunken brawl" into a "classier affair." Ira Magaziner, an organizer of the event wrote of the festival "We had James Brown, Dionne Warwick, Procol Harum, the Yardbirds and Dizzy Gillespie; for the poetry crowd we had Allen Ginsberg and Lawrence Ferlinghett... To launch the event, we chartered a small airplane to fly over the college green and dump thousands of colored ping pong balls stamped with WELCOME SPRING WEEKEND."

1970–1999 
Noted Spring Weekend acts in the 1970s included Tina Turner (1972) Bruce Springsteen (1974). Guests in the 1980s include U2 (1983), R.E.M. (1985), and Elvis Costello (1987). In 1984, following the passage of the National Minimum Drinking Age Act and Rhode Island's subsequent raising of the legal drinking age, the university brought off-duty state troopers to campus to perform optional breathalyzer tests. In 1991, Spring Weekend ended a longstanding practice of serving alcohol, apparently motivated by cost and potential liability issues. Artists featured in the 1990s include A Tribe Called Quest (1992), Indigo Girls (1995), Bob Dylan (1997), Sonic Youth (1998), Busta Rhymes and Common (1999).

2000–present 

Noted guests in the 2000s include Wyclef Jean (2000), Ben Folds (2005), M.I.A. (2008), Vampire Weekend (2008), and Nas (2009). Headliners in the 2010s included Snoop Dogg (2010), Childish Gambino (2012), Kendrick Lamar (2013), Chance the Rapper (2014), Mac DeMarco (2016), Young Thug (2017), and Mitski (2019). In 2013, The Brown Daily Herald and other campus press outlets received an email from a user impersonating the Brown Concert Agency that included a fake lineup of artists including "The Sounds of Capitalism," Toro Y Moi, The Postal Service, and Grouper.

COVID-19 pandemic 
In 2020, the festival was cancelled for the first time since 1950 in response to the COVID-19 pandemic. The Brown Concert Agency did not publicly announce which artists were scheduled to perform at the 2020 festival, although an unsubstantiated rumor purported the lineup to include Doja Cat. The 2021 festival featuring Phoebe Bridgers and KAYTRANADA was held online.

Lineups

References

Notes 

Brown University
Annual events in Rhode Island
Music festivals in Rhode Island
Music festivals established in 1950